Arsenio Rodríguez (born Ignacio Arsenio Travieso Scull; 31 August 1911 – 30 December 1970) was a Cuban musician, composer and bandleader. He played the tres, as well as the tumbadora, and he specialized in son, rumba and other Afro-Cuban music styles. In the 1940s and 1950s Rodríguez established the conjunto format and contributed to the development of the son montuno, the basic template of modern-day salsa. He claimed to be the true creator of the mambo and was an important as well as a prolific composer who wrote nearly two hundred songs.

Despite being blind since the age of seven, Rodríguez quickly managed to become one of Cuba's foremost treseros. Nonetheless, his first hit, "Bruca maniguá" by Orquesta Casino de la Playa, came as a songwriter in 1937. For the following two years, Rodríguez worked as composer and guest guitarist for the Casino de la Playa, before forming his conjunto in 1940, one of the first of its kind. After recording over a hundred songs for RCA Victor over the course of twelve years, Rodríguez moved to New York in 1952, where he remained active, releasing several albums. In 1970, Rodríguez moved to Los Angeles, where he died of pneumonia shortly before the end of the year.

Life and career

Early life
Ignacio Arsenio Travieso Scull was born on August 31, 1911,  in Güira de Macurijes in Bolondrón (Pedro Betancourt), Matanzas Province, as the third of fifteen children, fourteen boys and one girl, to Bonifacio Travieso, a veteran of the Cuban War of Independence who worked as a farmer, and Dorotea Rodríguez Scull. His family had Kongo origins, and both his grandfather and great-grandfather were practitioners of Palo Monte. By the time Arsenio was four, in 1915, his family moved to the town of Güines, where his three younger siblings (Estela, Israel "Kike" and Raúl) were born. In 1918, at around 7 years of age, Arsenio was blinded when a horse kicked him in the head after he accidentally hit the animal with a broom. This tragic event prompted Arsenio to become very close with his brother Kike, and to become interested in writing and performing songs.

The young brothers began playing the tumbadora at rumba performances in Matanzas and Güines, and became also immersed in the traditions of Palo Monte and its secular counterpart, yuka. Furthermore, their neighbour in the neighbourhood of Leguina, Güines, was a Santería practitioner who hosted celebrations for Changó, exposing Arsenio and Kike to West African drumming and chanting. In rural parties such as guateques, they also learned the son, a genre of music that originated in the eastern region of the island. Arsenio learned how to play the marímbula and the botija, two rudimentary instruments used in the rhythm section, and more importantly he took up the tres, a small guitar, now considered Cuba's national instrument. He received classes from Víctor González, a renowned tresero from Güines.

Following the destruction of their home by a Category 4 hurricane in 1926, Arsenio and his family moved from Güines to Havana, where he started playing in local groups around Marianao (his older brother Julio had already been living and working there). By 1928 he had formed the Septeto Boston which often performed in third-tier, working-class cabarets in the area. His father died in 1933 and sometime in the early 1930s, Arsenio changed his stage name from Travieso (which means "mischievous" or "naughty") to his mother's maiden name, Rodríguez, a fairly common Spanish surname. After dissolving the unsuccessful Septeto Boston in 1934, Rodríguez joined the Septeto Bellamar, directed by his uncle-in-law José Interián and featuring his cousin Elizardo Scull on vocals. The group often played at dance academies such as Sport Antillano.

Rise to fame
By 1938, Rodríguez was the de facto musical director of the Septeto Bellamar and his name had become familiar to important figures such as Antonio Arcaño and Miguelito Valdés. His acquaintance with the latter made it possible for one of his songs, "Bruca maniguá", to be recorded by the famous Orquesta Casino de la Playa in June 1937. The song, featuring Valdés on vocals, became an international hit and Rodríguez's breakthrough composition. The band also recorded Rodríguez's "Ben acá Tomá" in the same recording session, becoming their next A-side. In 1938 they recorded "Yo son macuá", "Funfuñando" (also a hit) and "Se va el caramelero", which included Rodríguez's first recorded performance, a remarkable solo on the tres.

In 1940, on the wave of his success with Casino de la Playa, Rodríguez formed his own conjunto, which featured three singers (playing claves, maracas and guitar), two trumpets, tres, piano, bass, tumbadora and bongo. At the time, only two other conjuntos existed: Conjunto Casino and Alberto Ruiz's Conjunto Kubavana. This type of ensemble would replace the former septetos, although some such as the Septeto Nacional would perform on and off for years. Of all the conjuntos, Arsenio Rodríguez's became the most successful and critically acclaimed one during the 1940s. His popularity earned him the nickname El Ciego Maravilloso (The Marvellous Blind Man). The first single by his conjunto was "El pirulero no vuelve más", a pregón which tried to capitalize on the success of "Se va el caramelero".

In 1947, Rodríguez went to New York for the first time. There, he hoped to get cured of his blindness but eye specialist Ramón Castroviejo was told that his optic nerves had been completely destroyed. This experience led him to compose the bolero "La vida es un sueño" (Life is a dream). He returned to New York in 1948 and 1950 before establishing himself in the city in 1952. He played with influential artists such as Chano Pozo, Machito, Dizzy Gillespie and Mario Bauzá. On March 18, 1952, Rodríguez made his final recordings with his band for RCA Victor in Cuba. He finally left Havana on March 22, 1952, having handed the direction of the conjunto to trumpeter Félix Chappottín. Chappottín and the other remaining members, including pianist Lilí Martínez and singer Miguelito Cuní, formed Conjunto Chappottín. He would return to Havana for the last time in 1956.

Later life and death 
During the 1960s, the mambo craze petered out, and Rodríguez continued to play in his typical style, although he did record some boogaloo numbers, without much success. As times changed, the popularity of his group declined. He tried a new start in Los Angeles. He invited his friend Alfonso Joseph to fly out to Los Angeles with him but died there only a week later, on December 30, 1970, from pneumonia. His body was returned for burial to New York. There is much speculation about his financial status during his last years, but Mario Bauzá denied that he died in poverty, arguing that Rodríguez had a modest income from royalties.

Innovations 
Rodríguez's chief innovation, his interpretation of the son montuno, established the basic template for Cuban popular dance music and salsa that continues to this day. "It took fifty years for Latin music to catch up with what Arsenio was doing in the 1940s"—Kevin Moore (2007: web).

Clave-based structure and offbeat emphasis
The decades of the 1920s and 1930s were a period which produced some of the most beautiful and memorable melodies of the son genre. At the same time, the rhythmic component had become increasingly deemphasized, or in the opinion of some, "watered-down". Rodríguez brought a strong rhythmic emphasis back into the son. His compositions are clearly based on the key pattern known in Cuba as clave, a Spanish word for 'key', or 'code'. 
When clave is written in two measures, as shown above, the measure with three strokes is referred to as the three-side, and the measure with two strokes—the two-side. When the chord progression begins on the three-side, the song, or phrase is said to be in 3-2 clave. When it begins on the two-side, it's in 2-3 clave. The 2-3 bass line of "Dame un cachito pa' huele" (1946) coincides with the three-side of the clave's five-note pattern.
David García identifies the accents of "and-of-two" (in cut-time) on the three-side, and the "and-of-four" (in cut-time) on the two-side of the clave, as crucial contributions of Rodríguez's music. The two offbeats are present in the following 2-3 bass line from Rodríguez's "Mi chinita me botó" (1944).

Moore points out that Rodríguez's conjunto introduced the two-celled bass tumbaos, that moved beyond the simpler, single-cell tresillo structure. This type of bass line has a specific alignment to clave, and contributes melodically to the composition. Rodríguez's brother Raúl Travieso recounted, Rodríguez insisted that his bass players make the bass "sing." Moore states: "This idea of a bass tumbao with a melodic identity unique to a specific arrangement was critical not only to timba, but also to Motown, rock, funk, and other important genres." In other words, Rodríguez is a creator of the bass riff.

Breaks ('cierres')

Rodríguez's "Juventud amaliana" (1946) contains an example of one of his rhythmically dynamic unison breaks, strongly rooted in clave.

Moore is referring to the second and third measures of the break in the previous example. Here is that figure in relation to 2-3 clave. When the pattern is used as a type of block chord guajeo, as in "Oye Como Va", it's referred to as ponchando.

Layered guajeos
Rodríguez introduced the idea of layered guajeos (typical Cuban ostinato melodies)—an interlocking structure consisting of multiple contrapuntal parts. This aspect of the son's modernization can be thought of as a matter of "re-Africanizing" the music. Helio Orovio recalls: "Arsenio once said his trumpets played figurations the 'Oriente' tres-guitarists played during the improvisational part of el son" (1992: 11). Oriente is the easternmost province of Cuba, where the son was born. It is common practice for treseros to play a series of guajeo variations during their solos. Perhaps it was only natural then that it was Rodríguez, the tres master, who conceived of the idea of layering these variations on top of each other. The following example is from the "diablo" section of Rodríguez's "Kila, Quique y Chocolate" (1950). The excerpt consists of four interlocking guajeos: piano (bottom line), tres (second line), 2nd and 3rd trumpets (third line), and 1st trumpet (fourth line). 2-3 Clave is shown for reference (top line). Notice that the piano plays a single celled (single measure) guajeo, while the other guajeos are two-celled. It's common practice to combine single and double-celled ostinatos in Afro-Cuban music.

Expansion of the son conjunto
The denser rhythmic weave of Rodríguez's music required the addition of more instruments. Rodríguez added a second, and then, third trumpet—the birth of the Latin horn section. He made the bold move of adding the conga drum, the quintessential Afro-Cuban instrument. Today, we are so used to seeing conga drums in Latin bands, and that practice began with Rodríguez. His bongo player used a large, hand-held cencerro ('cowbell') during montunos (call-and-response chorus sections). Rodríguez also added a variety of rhythms and harmonic concepts to enrich the son, the bolero, the guaracha and some fusions, such as the bolero-son. Similar changes had been made somewhat earlier by the Lecuona Cuban Boys, who (because they were mainly a touring band) had less influence in Cuba. The overall 'feel' of the Rodríguez conjunto was more African than other Cuban conjuntos.

Piano guajeos
Rodríguez took the pivotal step of replacing the guitar with the piano, which greatly expanded the contrapuntal and harmonic possibilities of Cuban popular music.

The piano guajeo for "Dame un cachito pa' huele" (1946) completely departs from both the generic son guajeo and the song's melody. The pattern marks the clave by accenting the backbeat on the two-side. Moore observes: "Like so many aspects of Arsenio's music, this miniature composition is decades ahead of its time. It would be forty years before groups began to consistently apply this much creative variation at the guajeo level of the arranging process" (2009: 41).

The piano guajeo for "Jumba" (a.k.a. "Zumba") (1951) is firmly aligned with clave, but also has a very strong nengón flavor — something which had rarely, or never, been used in Havana popular music. While Rodríguez was not from Oriente province (where nengón and changüí are played), he had a thorough knowledge of many folkloric styles and his creative partner, the pianist/composer Luis "Lilí" Martínez Griñán, in fact came from that part of the island.

Diablo, the proto-mambo?
Leonardo Acosta is not convinced by Rodríguez's claim to have invented the mambo, if by mambo Rodríguez meant the big-band arrangements of Dámaso Pérez Prado. Rodríguez was not an arranger: his lyrics and musical ideas were worked over by the group's arranger. The compositions were published with just the minimal bass and treble piano lines. To achieve the big-band mambo such as by Pérez Prado, Machito, Tito Puente or Tito Rodríguez requires a full orchestration where the trumpets play counterpoint to the rhythm of the saxophones. This, a fusion of Cuban with big-band jazz ideas, is not found in Rodríguez, whose musical forms are set in the traditional categories of Cuban music.

While it is true that the mambo of the 1940s, and 1950s contains elements not present in Rodríguez's music, there is considerable evidence that the contrapuntal structure of the mambo began in the conjunto of Arsenio Rodríguez. While working in the charanga Arcaño y Sus Maravillas, Orestes López "Macho" and his brother Israel López "Cachao" composed "Mambo" (1938), the first piece to use the term. A prevalent theory is that the López brothers were influenced by Rodríguez's use of layered guajeos (called diablo), and introduced the concept into the charanga's string section with their historical composition.

As Ned Sublette observes: "Arsenio maintained till the end of his life that the mambo — the big band style that exploded in 1949 — came out of his diablo, the repeating figures that the trumpets in the band played. Arsenio claimed to have already been doing that in the late 1930s" (2004: 508). As Rodríguez himself asserts: "In 1934, I was experimenting with a new sound which I fully developed in 1938." Max Salazar concurs: "It was Arsenio Rodríguez's band that used for the first time the rhythms which today are typical for every mambo" (1992: 10). In an early article on mambo, published in 1948, the writer Manuel Cuéllar Vizcaíno suggests that Rodríguez and Arcaño's styles emerged concurrently, which might account for the decades-long argument concerning the identity of the "true" inventor of the mambo. In the late 1940s Pérez Prado codified the contrapuntal structure of the mambo within a horn-based big band format.

Style 
Rodríguez's style was characterized by a strong Afro-Cuban basis, his son compositions being much more africanized than those by his contemporaries. This emphasis is observed in the high number of rumba and afro numbers in his catalogue, most notably his first famous composition, "Bruca maniguá". This is also exemplified by the inclusion of musical and linguistic elements from Abakuá, Lucumí (Santería), and Palo Monte traditions into his music.

On Palo Congo by Sabú Martínez (1957) Rodríguez sings and plays a traditional palo song and rhythm, a Lucumí song for Eleggua, and a rumba and a conga de comparsa accompanied by tres.

Rodríguez was an authentic rumbero; he both played the tumbadora and composed songs within the rumba genre, especially guaguancós. Rodríguez recorded folkloric rumbas and also fused rumba with son montuno. His "Timbilla" (1945) and "Anabacoa" (1950) are examples of the guaguancó rhythm used by a son conjunto. On "Timbilla", the bongós fulfill the role of the quinto (lead drum). In "Yambú en serenata" (1964) a yambú using a quinto is augmented by a tres, bass, and horns.

In 1956, Rodríguez released the folkloric rumbas "Con flores del matadero" and "Adiós Roncona" in Havana. The tracks consist of voice and percussion only. One of the last recordings Rodríguez performed on was the rumba album Patato y Totico by the conguero Carlos "Patato" Valdés and vocalist Eugenio "Totico" Arango (1967). The tracks are purely folkloric, except for the unconventional addition of Rodríguez on tres and Israel López "Cachao" on bass. Additional personnel included Papaíto and Virgilio Martí. Also released in the 1960s, the album Primitivo, featuring Monguito el Único and Baby González alternating on lead vocals, is an evocation of the music played in the solares.

Tributes 
There have been numerous tributes to Arsenio Rodríguez, especially in the form of LPs. In 1972, Larry Harlow recorded Tribute to Arsenio Rodríguez (Fania 404) with his band Orchestra Harlow. On this LP, five of the numbers had been recorded earlier by Rodríguez' conjunto. In 1994, the Cuban revivalist band Sierra Maestra recorded Dundunbanza! (World Circuit WCD 041), an album containing four Rodríguez numbers, including the title track.

Arsenio Rodríguez is mentioned in a national television production called La época, about the Palladium era in New York, and Afro-Cuban music. The film discusses Arsenio's contributions, and features some of the musicians he recorded with. Others interviewed in the movie include the daughter of legendary Cuban percussionist Mongo Santamaría – Ileana Santamaría, bongocero Luis Mangual and others.

Rodríguez's close friend and bassist for eight years Alfonso "El Panameño" Joseph, as well as other members of Rodríguez's band, such as Julián Lianos, who performed with Rodríguez at the Palladium Ballroom in New York during the 1960s, have had their legacies documented in a national television production called La Época, released in theaters in the US in September 2008, and in Latin America in 2009. He had much success in the US and migrated there in 1952, one of the reasons being the better pay of musicians.

Starting in the late 1990s, jazz guitarist Marc Ribot recorded two albums mostly of Rodríguez' compositions or songs in his repertoire:Marc Ribot y los Cubanos Postizos (or Marc Ribot and the Prosthetic/Fake Cubans) and Muy Divertido!. In 1999, Rodríguez was posthumously inducted into the International Latin Music Hall of Fame.

Belatedly, the borough of the Bronx officially had the intersection of Intervale Ave. and Dawson St. in the area known as Longwood renamed "Arsenio Rodríguez Way" in a dedication and unveiling ceremony on Thursday, June 6, 2013.

"That intersection was the center of his universe," said José Rafael Méndez, a community historian. "He lived in that area. And all the clubs he played, like the Hunts Point Palace, were practically a stone's throw away."

The street designation serves as the crowning jewel after an arduous series of collaborative efforts and events produced last year that rendered tribute to the band leader and resident performer of the Longwood community.

Notable compositions
The following songs composed by Arsenio Rodríguez are considered Cuban standards:
 "Bruca maniguá"
 "El reloj de Pastora"
 "Monte adentro"
 "Dundunbanza"
 "Como traigo la yuca" (also known as "La yuca de Catalina" or "Dile a Catalina")
 "Fuego en el 23"
 "Meta y guaguancó"
 "Kila, Kike y Chocolate"
 "Los sitios acere"
 "La fonda de el bienvenido"
 "Mami me gustó"
 "Papa Upa"
 "El divorcio"
 "Anabacoa"
 "Adiós Roncona"
 "Dame un cachito pa' huelé"
 "Yo no como corazón de chivo"
 "Juégame limpio"

Discography

References

1911 births
1970 deaths
Deaths from pneumonia in California
Burials at Ferncliff Cemetery
Cuban guitarists
Blind musicians
Cuban songwriters
Male songwriters
Cuban bandleaders
Tres players
People from Havana
Cuban emigrants to the United States
Son cubano musicians
20th-century guitarists
20th-century male musicians
Cuban people of Kongo descent
Cuban male guitarists